HMCS Cormorant (PCS 781) was a Bird-class patrol vessel of the Royal Canadian Navy. The patrol vessel entered service in 1956 and was paid off in 1963. Held in reserve, Cormorant was discarded in the 1970s.

Design
Bird-class patrol vessels were designed for harbour patrol, training and anti-submarine warfare. Constructed of wood and aluminum, Cormorant displaced .

The Bird class were powered by diesel engines creating  connected to two shafts. Cormorant was armed with one 20 mm Oerlikon cannon and a Hedgehog anti-submarine mortar.

Construction and career
Cormorant was laid down by Midland Boat Works at Midland, Ontario and launched on 15 May 1956. The vessel was commissioned on 16 July 1956. The ship was intended to replace the remaining Fairmile motor launches that remained from the Second World War, performing cadet training and search and rescue operations along the coasts. In 1961, Cormorant was assigned to Atlantic Command as a harbour patrol craft. Cormorant was paid off on 23 May 1963 and placed in reserve alongside her sister ships. The Bird class was kept in reserve until discarded in 1970–1971.

Citations

Sources

External links
 Bird Class – Radio Fit – Radio Research Paper

 

1956 ships
Canadian Bird-class patrol vessels
Ships built in Ontario